Bromley Reform Synagogue is a synagogue in Shortlands, Bromley in the London Borough of Bromley; it serves the areas of south east London and north west Kent including Bromley, Beckenham, Orpington, Blackheath, Dartford, Maidstone, Sevenoaks, Tonbridge and Tunbridge Wells.

The community was established in 1964 and has been based in its present location since 1967. The sanctuary has been refurbished in light wood and glass to reflect the Hebrew name of the community, Beit Or, House of Light.

Laura Janner-Klausner has been the community's Rabbi since April 2022.

Affiliation and staff 

Bromley Reform Synagogue is a member of the Movement for Reform Judaism.

Services 

Services are held every Shabbat on Friday evening and Saturday morning as well as for all Jewish festivals. Services are egalitarian; men and women sit together and take an equal role in the religious life of the community.

Family services are held regularly through the year and are normal Shabbat services but are shorter (one hour) with much participation, less formality, storytelling rather than a haftarah, songs and no sermon.

Services are led by the Rabbi or lay readers, using the standard Reform liturgy. There are also other services, mainly on Friday nights, when the format differs, and there is a great deal of opportunity for participation by lay members, many of whom also lead services when the rabbi is absent.

Community 

The synagogue has an inclusive approach to Judaism and all sorts of people are involved in the community including born Jews with varying degrees of Jewish knowledge, people considering conversion or actively engaged in study for conversion, mixed-faith families and people who have lost contact with their Judaism and are looking for a way back.

A wide range of events and activities are organised – youth, education, social, religious and local area groups which organise social events in their own neighbourhoods. There is a social centre for older people with coffee and socialising, board and card games, gentle physical exercises and a discussion on a topical issue followed by lunch and a talk or entertainment. There are also some special interest groups and the rabbi sometimes gives talks and lecture series.

Education 

There is a strong emphasis on families learning together and the synagogue has a cheder (religion school) for children aged 5–14 where they study Hebrew and learn about Judaism. There is also a thriving gan yeladim (kindergarten) on Sunday mornings with activities, food and songs for toddlers and their parents, and facilities for children from birth upwards.

Young people 

The community has made funding available for members of its B'nei Mitzvah class to attend Shemesh, the summer camps organised by RSY-Netzer, the Zionist youth movement for Reform Judaism. Young people are also encouraged to participate in Jewish holiday camps and in Europe tours and gap year schemes organised with Israel Experience. They also have the opportunity to join in local youth activities with Maccabi and the Jewish Lads' and Girls' Brigade, among others, and with RSY-Netzer.

Communications 

Bromley Reform Synagogue's website was recognised in the 2009 Board of Deputies Media Awards, when it won the prize for best synagogue website. The community has a weekly e-newsletter e-Light as well as a monthly printed newsletter, Highlight, itself an award-winning publication.

See also 
 List of Jewish communities in the United Kingdom
 List of former synagogues in the United Kingdom
Movement for Reform Judaism

References

External links 
 
 The Movement for Reform Judaism
 RSY-Netzer
 Bromley Reform Synagogue on Jewish Communities and Records – UK (hosted by jewishgen.org), accessed 24 November 2010.

1964 establishments in England
Jewish organizations established in 1964
Reform synagogues in the United Kingdom
Religion in the London Borough of Bromley
Synagogues in London